Bishop Tyrrell Anglican College (abbreviated as BTAC) is an Independent co-educational school from Pre-school to Year 12, owned by the Anglican Diocese of Newcastle located in the  suburb of Fletcher, New South Wales, Australia.

See also 

 List of Anglican schools in New South Wales
 Anglican education in Australia

References

External links
 

Anglican secondary schools in New South Wales
Education in Newcastle, New South Wales
Anglican primary schools in New South Wales
Educational institutions established in 1998
1998 establishments in Australia
Anglican Diocese of Newcastle (Australia)